Echo State Park is a state park on the Echo Reservoir in northwestern Summit County, Utah, United States, just west of the city of Coalville.

Description
As with similar state parks located on reservoirs in Utah, Echo State Park offers boating, fishing, hiking, etc.

See also

 List of Utah State Parks

References

External links

 

Protected areas of Summit County, Utah
State parks of Utah